Maria Thompson Daviess (November 28, 1872 – September 3, 1924) was an American artist and feminist author. She is best known for her popular novels written in the early 20th century, with a "Pollyanna" outlook, as well as several short stories, among them, “Miss Selina Sue and the Soap-Box Babies," "Sue Saunders of Saunders Ridge" and "Some Juniors.". Daviess was affiliated with the Equal Suffrage League in Kentucky, being the co-founder and vice-president of the chapter in Nashville and an organizer of the chapter in Madison.

Biography
Maria (sometimes "Marie") Thompson Daviess was born in Harrodsburg, Kentucky, November 28, 1872. Her parents were John Burton Thompson Daviess (a relative of the Harrodsburg-born writer Zoe Anderson Norris) and Leonora Hamilton Daviess. The father, John B. T. Daviess, died when she was eight, and the family subsequently relocated to Nashville, Tennessee. Her paternal grandmother, also named Maria Thompson Daviess, was a columnist and lecturer.

Daviess studied one year at Wellesley College, and then travelled to Paris to study art.  Returning to Nashville, she continued to paint and also took up writing. Her first novel, Miss Selina Lue and the Soap-box Babies was published in 1909.  The Melting of Molly, published in 1912, was one of the top best-selling books for the year.  She published sixteen novels between 1909 and 1920.

She resided in Nashville, Tennessee in 1910, but in 1921, she moved to New York City, where she died in September 1924. She did not marry and had no children.

Bibliography

 Miss Selina Lue and the Soap-box Babies (1909)
 The Road To Providence (1910)
 Rose of Old Harpeth (1911)
 The Treasure Babies (1911)
 The Melting of Molly (1912)
 The Elected Mother, A Story of Woman's Equal Rights (1912)
 Andrew the Glad (1913)
 The Tinder Box (1913) 
 Sue Jane (1913)
 Phyllis (1914; a "Harpeth Valley" story)
 Over Paradise Ridge (1915)
 The Daredevil (1916) – filmed in 1918
 The Heart's Kingdom (1917)
 Out of a Clear Sky (1917) – filmed in 1918 as Out of a Clear Sky with Marguerite Clark
 The Golden Bird (1918) – filmed in 1918 as Little Miss Hoover with Marguerite Clark
 Bluegrass and Broadway (1919)
 The Matrix (1920)
 Seven Times Seven (1924) (autobiography)

References

Attribution

External links

 
 
 
 
 

1872 births
1924 deaths
20th-century American novelists
19th-century American painters
20th-century American painters
American women painters
Painters from Kentucky
Painters from Tennessee
People from Harrodsburg, Kentucky
People from Nashville, Tennessee
Wellesley College alumni
Novelists from Kentucky
Novelists from Tennessee
American women novelists
20th-century American women writers
20th-century American women artists
19th-century American women artists
Kentucky women writers